Jomanda was an American female house music vocal trio from New Jersey. Members included Joanne Thomas, Cheri Williams, and Renee Washington.

Biography
Jomanda had several hits on the US Billboard Hot Dance Club Play chart during the first half of the 1990s, including "Got a Love for You," which reached #1 in 1991. The song also crossed over to the mainstream, going top 40 (peaking at #40) on the US Billboard Hot 100.

In 1993, the trio returned to #1 on the dance chart with "Don't You Want Me", a track credited to Felix featuring Jomanda.

The song "Make My Body Rock" appeared on Dance! Online, a multiplayer online casual rhythm game, and on Grand Theft Auto: San Andreas.

Joanne Thomas' death
Group member Joanne Thomas died in October 2003, after a three-year battle with colon cancer.

Discography

Albums
1990: Someone to Love Me (Big Beat/Atlantic Records)
1993: Nubia Soul (Big Beat/Atlantic Records)

Singles
 As lead artist

As featured artist

See also
List of number-one dance hits (United States)
List of artists who reached number one on the US Dance chart

References

American dance music groups
American house music groups
American girl groups
Big Beat Records (American record label) artists